David Elebert (born 21 March 1986 in Dublin) is an Irish former professional football player who is a coach at NIFL Premiership Ards

His uncle Shaun played for Shamrock Rovers and Longford Town in the early 1990s and won the Football Association of Ireland International Schools Player of the Year for 1990/91.

Career

Club
Elebert began his career as a trainee at Preston North End but failed to make any first team appearances for the club. In 2005, he had a loan spell at Scarborough.

He was signed by Hamilton in January 2006 having been released by Preston and signed a new two-year deal in May 2008.

He was released by Hamilton Academical at the end of season 2010/11. He joined Icelandic club Fylkir on 12 April 2012. He made his debut for the club in the 1–1 draw with Keflavík on 6 May 2012 and scored his first goal in Icelandic football in the 2–1 defeat away at KR on 5 July 2012.

In February 2013 Elebert signed for Shamrock Rovers where he won an EA Sports and a Setanta Sports Cup winners medal.

On 12 February 2014, Elebert signed for Derry City   under Roddy Collins.

On 27 January 2015, Elebert signed for NIFL Premiership side and 2013–14 Irish Cup winners Glenavon, signing an 18-month contract with the Lurgan Blues.

Elebert won the 2015–16 Irish Cup with Glenavon, and left the club at the end of the 2016–17 season.

On 15 June 2017, Elebert signed for Ards.

International
He was called up to the Republic of Ireland's under-21s in May 2008 and made his debut against Malaysia's under-23s later that month. He captained the side against Nigeria in his next game.

Honours
Hamilton Academical
 Scottish Football League First Division: 2007–08

Shamrock Rovers
 Setanta Cup: 2013
 EA Sports Cup: 2013

Glenavon
 Irish Cup: 2015–16

References

External links

1986 births
Association football defenders
Hamilton Academical F.C. players
Living people
Preston North End F.C. players
Republic of Ireland association footballers
Republic of Ireland under-21 international footballers
Scarborough F.C. players
Scottish Football League players
Scottish Premier League players
Republic of Ireland expatriate association footballers
Expatriate footballers in England
Expatriate footballers in Scotland
Expatriate footballers in Iceland
Shamrock Rovers F.C. players
League of Ireland players
Ards F.C. players
Glenavon F.C. players
Derry Celtic F.C. players